Maria Carolina Martinez Deslandes (born August 27, 1991), known as Carolina Deslandes, is a Portuguese singer and songwriter. In December 2010, she finished as the third-place finalist on the fourth season of Ídolos Portugal. She has released three albums: Carolina Deslandes (2012), Blossom (2016) and Casa (2018). "A Vida Toda" (2017), a single from Casa, reached number nine on the Portuguese Singles Chart and, as of June 2021 its music video has more than 11 million views on YouTube.

Career
In 2021, Deslandes was confirmed to be taking part in Festival da Canção 2021, with the song "Por um triz".

From 2021 to 2022, Deslandes was a coach on The Voice Kids Portugal. In 2022, Deslandes began serving as a coach on the adult version, The Voice Portugal, alongside Marisa Liz, Dino d'Santiago, and Diogo Piçarra.

Ídolos

Discography

Studio albums

Singles

References

 "Carolina Deslandes – Idolos 2010". Idolos 2010. Retrieved 2010.
 "Carolina Deslandes é quem mais ordena no Facebook". Jornal de Notícias. Retrieved December 11, 2010.
 "Carolina Deslandes ficou com o 3º lugar". Activa. Retrieved December 28, 2010.

1991 births
21st-century Portuguese women singers
Idols (franchise) participants
Golden Globes (Portugal) winners
Living people
Portuguese women singer-songwriters
Portuguese people of British descent
Singers from Lisbon